Toorpu Velle Railu is a 1979 Telugu-language film directed by Bapu. The film stars Mohan (in his Telugu debut), Jyothi, Rallapalli, and Sakshi Ranga Rao. It is a remake of the Tamil film Kizhake Pogum Rail.

Cast 
Mohan as Raamanna
Jyothi as Alimelu
Rallapalli as Sivudu
Sakshi Ranga Rao as Poojari

Soundtrack 
The music for the film was composed by playback singer S. P. Balasubrahmanyam. The lyrics were written by Aarudhra & Jaladi Raja Rao.

References

External links 
 Toorpu Velle Railu film at IMDb.

1970s Telugu-language films
1979 films
Films directed by Bapu
Telugu remakes of Tamil films
Films scored by S. P. Balasubrahmanyam